Henry Philip Manus (21 July 1851 – 24 October 1931) was a Dutch philatelist who signed the Roll of Distinguished Philatelists in 1924. He was a member of the Royal Philatelic Society London from 1910 and that society's special representative in the Netherlands.

References

Signatories to the Roll of Distinguished Philatelists
Dutch philatelists
Fellows of the Royal Philatelic Society London
1851 births
1931 deaths